Fran Mary Ryan (November 29, 1916 January 15, 2000) was an American character actress featured in television and films. She was born in Los Angeles, California.

Career
Ryan began performing at the age of six at Oakland's Henry Duffy Theatre. She attended Stanford University for three years, and during World War II was a member of the USO entertaining troops. She performed comedy, singing and acting on stage in California and Chicago, and launched her television career two decades later. Her television debut came in episode 43 of Batman, in 1966, followed by a bit part in Beverly Hillbillies. She also appeared in a 1972 episode of Columbo, Dagger of the Mind, as "uncredited woman at the airport."

Ryan's first supporting cast television role was as Aggie Thompson in the first several episodes of The Doris Day Show. The same season, she was offered the replacement role on the series Green Acres as Doris Ziffel from 1969 to 1971. Ryan replaced Barbara Pepper, who was in poor health.  Ryan also starred on the long-running TV Western series Gunsmoke during its 20th and final season as Miss Hannah (Cobb). In 1987, she reprised the role of Miss Hannah in the TV movie Gunsmoke: Return to Dodge.

Ryan played the role of Rosie Carlson in the soap opera Days of Our Lives (1976–1979) and Sister Agatha in General Hospital in 1989. She also did voices for cartoons such as Hong Kong Phooey, Mister T, and Little Dracula. Fran starred on some TV shows for children, such as Sigmund and the Sea Monsters in 1975 as Gertrude Grouch, the 1970s children's show New Zoo Revue as Ms. Goodbody, the 1980s TV series No Soap, Radio as Mrs. Belmont, and the short-lived 1980s CBS TV series The Wizard as Tillie Russell from 1986 to 1987. Her last regular TV role was on The Dave Thomas Comedy Show.

Ryan also appeared in a series of commercials for Hungry Jack biscuits beginning in 1975.

She appeared in many feature films, including Big Wednesday (1978), as Frank and Jesse James' mother in The Long Riders (1980), Take This Job and Shove It (1981), Pale Rider (1985), Chances Are (1989), and a cameo appearance in 1981's Stripes, as a cab fare to Bill Murray as the cabbie, in the opening scenes of the film. Ryan made many guest appearances on TV shows, including Batman (episode 43), Adam-12, CHiPs, The Dukes of Hazzard, Quantum Leap, Night Court, Taxi, Baywatch, and The Commish.

Personal life
Fran's first husband, Walter Kenneth Wayne (whom she married in Fairbanks, Alaska in 1949), died in a plane crash, in a plane he was piloting in January 1951, while Fran was pregnant with their first and only child. She gave birth to their son, Christopher, in April 1951. Fran remarried in January 1953 to Howard Schafer. Howard, too, perished in a plane crash in Oregon in May 1953 in a plane he was piloting. The wreckage of Howard's plane was not discovered until 15 years later in November 1968. The remains of Howard and his passengers were never found. All that was found at the crash site was a woman's shoe, four combs, and two pair of eyeglasses.

Death
Ryan died on January 15, 2000, at age 83. She was cremated and her ashes buried in 2004 in the family plot, alongside her mother Mary, at the Holy Sepulchre Cemetery, Hayward, California.

Filmography

Film

Television

References

External links

 
 
 
 The Wizard Official Fansite & Definitive Cyberhome

1916 births
2000 deaths
20th-century American actresses
Actresses from Los Angeles
American film actresses
Catholics from California
American soap opera actresses
American television actresses
American voice actresses
Burials in Alameda County, California